Cencosud S.A. is a publicly traded multinational retail company. It's the largest retail company in Chile and the third largest listed retail company in Latin America, competing with the Brazilian Companhia Brasileira de Distribuição and the Mexican Walmart de México y Centroamérica as one of the largest retail companies in the region. The company has more than 1045 stores in Latin America.

History
By the end of 2006, the operations of the company included 65 Jumbo hypermarkets, 165 Santa Isabel supermarkets; 249 Disco, Vea and Jumbo supermarkets; 60 Easy home improvement stores; 36 Paris department stores; 27 shopping malls and 52 offices of Banco Paris bank, totaling a sales area of 1.8 million square meters, or 19,375,038.75 square feet. It has more than 4.3 million active credit card accounts, issued under the brand Tarjeta Cencosud (in Chile, Peru and Argentina), Tarjeta Cencosud Colpatria (Colombia) and Cartão Cencosud Bradesco (Brazil).

By the end of 2007, several new stores had been opened in Chile, Argentina and Peru, and the company acquired Wong supermarkets, the largest retailer in Peru, and GBarbosa, a Brazilian retailer.

In August 2011, Cencosud announced the acquisition of Johnson department stores.

Brands
Cencosud operates upscale Paris department stores, the Costanera Center financial center, Easy home improvement and hardware stores, Jumbo hypermarkets, Santa Isabel supermarkets, in Chile. Also operates Bretas supermarkets, G Barbosa super and hypermarkets, Prezunic supermarkets and Perini supermarkets in Brazil, Vea and Disco supermarkets in Argentina, Wong and Metro in Peru and in 2012 acquired the Carrefour hypermarket operations in Colombia, which changed branding to Jumbo.

References

External links
 Official website

 
Retail companies of Chile
Retail companies established in 1960
Companies listed on the Santiago Stock Exchange
Companies formerly listed on the New York Stock Exchange
1960 establishments in Chile
Companies based in Santiago
Chilean brands